Isabella Hindley (born 1 October 1996) is a British swimmer. She competed at the 2022 British Swimming Championships, winning a silver medal in 50 Freestyle. She competed at the 2022 Commonwealth Games with  Team England.

Life 
Isabella attended St Paul's Girls' School in Hammersmith, West London. She graduated from Branford College.
She competed for Yale University. She was Ivy league champion in 100 Yards Freestyle, and 50 Yards Freestyle setting  Ivy league records.
She swam for the DC Trident, and Team Iron in the International Swimming League. She trains with  Brompton Swimming Club. She was selected for the 2022 European Championships.

References 

1996 births
British swimmers
Living people
Sportspeople from London
Yale Bulldogs women's swimmers
Swimmers at the 2022 Commonwealth Games
Commonwealth Games medallists in swimming
Commonwealth Games silver medallists for England
20th-century British women
21st-century British women
Medallists at the 2022 Commonwealth Games